Gurdwara Karamsar Rara Sahib or Gurdwara Rara Sahib is situated at village Rara Sahib near Ludhiana.
Rara Sahib is a village near Ludhiana city in Punjab, India. This village was transformed from simple Rara to Rara Sahib due to the visit by the sixth Sikh Guru, Guru Hargobind Ji.

Rara Sahib is located 22 km south-east of Ludhiana, 14 km north-east of Ahmedgarh and 22 km north-west of Khanna. It lies on the Chawa-Payal-Ahmedgarh road and is situated on the bank of Bathinda branch of the Sirhind Canal.

The village has become famous in recent times because of the dedication of Sant Isher Singh Ji and Sant Kishan Singh Ji. On the request of Sardar Gian Singh Rarewala, they had stayed in the village Rara Sahib and had made this desolate place their abode. Subsequently, a huge Gurdwara complex known as Gurdwara Karamsar was built besides this village.

History
Sant Isher Singh Ji and Sant Kishan Singh Ji stayed in this village and had made this desolate place their abode and this huge Gurdwara complex was built. This holy abode has been a place of worship and penance of the saint, the great "Sriman 111" Sant Isher Singh Ji. This is the place where he tirelessly devoted himself to God. 
The present form of the Gurdwara is a monument built in his memory. Sant Kishan Singh Ji undertook and handled all the services at the Gurdwara and set Sant Isher Singh Ji free of all these responsibilities. When the latter Isher Singh left his mortal world of eternity the whole responsibility of preaching came upon his shoulders.

Image gallery

See also
Gurdwaras in India

References

External links
 Gurdwara Karamsar, Rara Sahib
 Wikimapia link

Sikh places
Gurdwaras in Punjab, India
Buildings and structures in Ludhiana